Ligurian cuisine consists of dishes from the culinary tradition of Liguria, a region of northwestern Italy, which makes use of ingredients linked both to local production (such as preboggion, a mixture of wild herbs), and to imports from areas with which, over the centuries, the Ligurians have had frequent trade (such as Sardinian pecorino, one of the ingredients of pesto).

Characteristics 
Ligurian cuisine is affected by the geomorphological characteristics of its territory. It makes use of ingredients coming from the sea as well as game and meat. Ligurian cuisine has transformed over the centuries in relation to the socio-economic situation of the region. The scarcity of cattle pastures forced the Ligurians to develop dishes based on alternative ingredients such as fish and herbs, to which game was subsequently added. Ligurians pair their meat condiments based on wild or cultivated herbs, among which pesto stands out, which is used both as a sauce for pasta as well as being added to autumnal soups with a variety of fresh vegetables. Also important are the many savoury pies with vegetables, the most famous of which are the pasqualina cake, the ripieni and focaccia traditionally filled with stracchino cheese known as focaccia col formaggio. There are dishes based on ingredients such as herbs or chestnuts traditionally eaten by farmers.
The preservation of food and therefore the use of Mason jars is fundamental in Ligurian cuisine, traditionally filled with mushrooms in oil, jams, honey, salted anchovies, brined foods, and dips.

Starters (antipasti) 
 Acciughe sotto sale
 Barbajuan
 Farinata bianca
 Farinata con il cipollotto
 Farinata con cipollotto e boraggine
 Farinata con il rosmarino
 Farinata di ceci
 Farinata di zucca
 'e fugasette
 Focaccia con il formaggio
 Genoan focaccia
 Focaccia con le cipolle
 Focaccia con le olive
 Frittelle di lattuga, friscioeu, o friscioli
 Panissa(it)
 Pissaladière (with anchovies)
 Polpettone di melanzane
 salame di Sant'Olcese
 Sardenaira (only made with fish oil, without using anchovies nor sardines.)
 Testaieu
 Testaroli
 Torta pasqualina
 Antipasto di funghi
 Antipasto misto di mare
 Antipasto misto ligure (con specialità locali dell'entroterra)
 Biscotti salati
 Crocchette di patate (impanate e fritte)
 Cuculli, frittelle di farina di ceci
 Farinata con i bianchetti (in dialetto gianchetti)
 Focaccia con le patate
 Focaccia ripiena
 Fritelle di cipolla
 Frittelle di pastella con fiori di zucca
 Frittelle di pastella con fiori zucca e pesce (bianchetti, ecc.)
 Gattafin
 Insalata di polpo
 Mortadella nostrale
 Mostardella di Sant'Olcese
 Mousse di funghi
 Olive marinate
 Pizza bianca con patate e fagiolini
 Polpettine fritte
 Polpo e patate
 Salsicce di Pignone
 Sgabei
 Torta baciocca, di patate e cipolle
 Torta di bietole
 Torta di carciofi
 Torta di patate
 Torta di riso
 Torta di trombette
 Torta di zucca
 Torta verde mista
 Verdure ripiene (con verdure o carne e verdura)

Sauces 
 Apple vinegar varietà di aceto
 Aggiadda
 Aglié
 Machetto or anchovy paste
 Pesto with basil
 Marò
 Ragù bianco
 Ragù di coniglio
 Ragù di selvaggina (cinghiale, lepre, cervo, ecc.)
 Ragù genovese, u toccu
 Salsa di noci
 Salsa di tartufo
 Salsa verde
 Sugo ligure
 Sugo di funghi
 Sugo con olive "taggiasche"
 Sugo di pesce

Pasta, rice and soups 
 Battolli
 Bavette
 Bricchetti
 Corzetti
 Fidelini
 Gnocchi
 Gran pistau
 Lasagne with pesto
 Lasagne alla ligure
 Lasagnetta di pesce
 Linguine
 Mandilli
 Mescciüa
 Minestrone alla genovese
 Pane cotto
 Panigacci
 Pansoti
 Pappardelle
 Ravioli alla ligure (con "tuccu a-a zeneize")
 Ravioli di borragine
 Risotto ai carciofi
 Risotto ai frutti di mare
 Risotto ai funghi
 Risotto con sugo di trombette
 Scocuzzù
 Taglierini
 Trenette
 Trofie
 Zembi d'arzillo, fish ravioli
 Zemin di ceci

Fish 
 Acciughe in salamoia, dissalate, sott'olio
 Acciughe ripiene
 Baccalà al verde
 Bagnun
 Boghe in scabeccio
 Brandacujun
 Buridda
 Cappon magro
 Cicciarelli di Noli
 Ciuppin
 frexieoi de bacalà
 Gianchetti
 Rossetti
 Mosciame
 Muscoli alla marinara
 Mediterranean mussel.
 Stuffed mussels
 Pignurin alla salsa di pomodoro
 Seppie in zimino
 Seppie alla spezzina
 Stoccafisso accomodato
 Tonno alla genovese

Meats 
 Roasted lamb
 Asado
 Capra e fagioli
 Capretto
 Carne alla ciappa
 Cima
 Coniglio alla ligure
Coniglio alla Sanremese
 Cinghiale alla ligure con polenta
 Boar meat
 Fratti
 Fricassea di pollo alla ligure
 Frizze from Val Bormida, liver and pork sausage
 Gallo nero della val di Vara
 Giancu e negru (Bianco e nero), fritto misto alla genovese di frattaglie d'agnello note come (coratella)
 Prosciutto di Castelnuovo Magra
 Rostelle
 sanguinaccio (berodo)
 Game meats (such as venison, roe deer, hare)
 Stecchi fritti
 Tacchino alla storiona
 Head cheese
 Trippa alla genovese
 Sbira
 Trippa fritta
 Insalata di Trippa
 Vitello all'uccelletto
 Zucchine ripiene alla Ligure

Vegetables 
 Asparago violetto of Albenga and Perinaldo
 Borage
 zucchini flower
 Perinaldo artichokes
 Carciofo violetto d'Albenga
 Cavolo lavagnino o Bronzino di Lavagna
 Condiglione
 Common bean of Badalucco
 Common bean of Pigna
 Common bean of Conio
 Cabbage
 Quarantine potato
 Preboggion
 Scorzonera
 Segranna
 Truffles from Val Bormida
 Verdure ripiene,
 Pumpkin from Rocchetta Cengio
 Pumpkin from trombetta d'Albenga
 Courgette from alberello di Sarzana

Cheeses 
 Brös
 Caprino cheese
 Casareccio di Gorreto
 Formaggetta della Val Graveglia,
 Formaggetta della Val di Vara
 Formaggetta Savonese
 Mozzarella di Brugnato
 Brutto ma buono di Brugnato
 Vaise
 Giuncata
 Mollana
 Prescinsêua cheese
 Ricotta ligure (Recottu)
 San Sté
 Tuma from brigasca sheep
 Toma di Mendatica dell'Alta Valle Arroscia

Fruits 
Fruits and fruit salad is usually paired with sweet, white or red wines.

 Apricots from Valleggia (Quiliano),
 Fresh and dried Chestnuts from Calizzano and Murialdo
 Cherries from Sarzana and Castelbianco
 Apples,
 Grapes

Desserts 
 Baxin
 Biscotti del Lagaccio
 Amaretto(it)
 Canestrelli
 Castagnaccio
 Castagnole
 Angel wings
 Dragée
 Gelato alla Mimosa
 Latte dolce
 Mescolanza
 Michetta di Dolceacqua
 Olandesina
 Genoa cake
 Panera
 Risiny
 Sacripantina
 Spongata
 Amaretti di Savona
 Anicini
 Baci di Sanremo
 Baci della Riviera (i più noti sono quelli di Alassio, ma ne esistono molte altre varianti)
 Baci di dama
 Biscotti alla lavanda
 Brioche Falstaff
 Buccellato di Sarzana
 Canditi di Genova
 Canestrello di Montoggio
 Cioccolato genovese
 Croccante di mandorle
 Cubaite
 Focaccia dolce di Sarzana
 Frittelle di mele
 Frittelle di San Giuseppe
 Frutta farcita al caramello
 Gelato "Paciugo"
 Chestnut Gelato
 Gobeletti
 Pane del marinaio
 Quaresimali
 Ravioli dolci
 Camogliesi al Rum
 Chocolate salami
 Salame dolce alla marmellata
 Salamella di cioccolato e biscotto
 Sciuette di Varese Ligure
 Torta di riso dolce
 Torta di Mazzini
 Torta Zena
 Dragiate

Drinks 
 Beer
 Rose syrup from Valle Scrivia
 Amaretto di Portofino
 Amaretto di Sassello
 Amaro Camatti
 Amaro Santa Maria al Monte
 Basilichito
 Chinotto
 Distillato di prugna di Varese Ligure
 Erba Luisa or Cedrina
 Grappa delle Cinque Terre
 Limonata di Portofino
 Limoncino delle Cinque Terre
 Basil liquor
 Perseghin
 Cider
 Sambuca

Wines from the Imperia province 
 Ormeasco
 Pigato
 Rossese di Dolceacqua
 Rossese di Dolceacqua superiore
 Vermentino
 Moscatello di Taggia

Wines from the Savona province 
 Lumassina
 Pigato
 Rossese d'Albenga
 Vermentino
 Granaccia
 Nostralino di Finalborgo

Wines from the Genoa province 
 Bianchetta Genovese
 Bianco Tigullio
 Bianco frizzante del Tigullio
 Bianco di Coronata
 Ciliegiolo del Tigullio
 Ciliegiolo novello del Tigullio
 Moscato del Tigullio
 Polceverasco
 Rosso del Tigullio
 Spumante del Tigullio
 Vermentino del Tigullio
 Corochinato

Wines from the La Spezia province 
 Albarola
 Bianco di Luni
 Bianco di Levanto
 Cinque Terre
 Novello di Levanto
 Rosso di Levanto
 Rosso di Luni
 Rosso riserva di Luni
 Sciachetrà
 Vermentino di Luni

Bibliography 
 Franco Accame, Silvio Torre, Virgilio Pronzati. Il grande libro della cucina ligure: la storia, le ricette, i vini. Genova: De Ferrari. 2000. ISBN 8871720547.
 Renzo Bagnasco. La cucina ligure: piatti di ieri, ricette di oggi: 335 ricette: r e curiosità sulla tradizionale cucina ligure. Sagep. 1999. ISBN 8870587592
 Nada Boccalatte Bagnasco e Renzo Bagnasco. La tavola ligure ovvero Le ricette tradizionali per la cucina d'oggi. Milano: Edi. Artes. 1991. ISBN 8877240032.
 Andrea Carpi, Fulvio Santorelli. . 2009. ISBN 978-88-95470-14-6.
 Rudy Ciuffardi, Vincenzo Gueglio. Da un bosco in cima al mare. Gammarò. 2006.
 Franca Feslikenian. Cucina e vini della Liguria. Edizioni Mursia.
 Giuseppe Gavotti. Cucina e vini in Liguria. Editore Sabelli.
 Pierina Giauna Piagentini. Odore di focolare: i sapori della cucina tradizionale ligure: in 165 ricette della cucina tradizionale ligure in lingua italiana e dialetto ventimigliese. Pinerolo: Alzani. 2003. ISBN 8881701898.
 Paolo Lingua. La cucina dei genovesi. Muzio. 2004. ISBN 9788874130016
 Salvatore Marchese. La cucina ligure di Levante: le fonti, le storie, le ricette. Padova: Muzzio. 1990. ISBN 8870214842
 Alessandro Molinari Pradelli. La cucina ligure: i piatti tradizionali e quelli più attuali di una gastronomia che ha saputo esaltare come poche altre i sapori della sua terra. Roma: Newton Compton. 1996. ISBN 8881835258.
 Giobatta Ratto. La cuciniera genovese. Editore: Pagano. Genova. 1893. Antico libro di ricette genovesi on-line.
 Emanuele Rossi e Giobatta Ratto. La vera cuciniera genovese facile ed economica. Editore: Giacomo Arneodo. Torino. 189.? Antico libro di ricette genovesi on-line.
 Aidano Schmuckher. Pesto e morta. Il grande libro della cucina ligure. Genova. Mondani. 1984.

References